Balloch railway station is a railway station serving the town of Balloch in Scotland.

History

Balloch station was opened by British Rail and SPTE on 24 April 1988, replacing the former  station which was situated immediately north of a level crossing on Balloch Road. Closure of this level crossing was made possible by the closure of the previous terminus station, Balloch Pier, in 1986. This relocation allowed the level crossing to be closed.

Location 

Facilities 
The station has a ticket office, an accessible toilet, a shelter, seats, a help point and bike racks. The station has a stepped entrance from Tulliwchewan Road, and three step-free entrances from Balloch Road, Lomond Road and Balloch Road. All of the station is step-free.

Passenger volume 

The statistics cover twelve month periods that start in April.

Services 

References

Bibliography

External links

Video footage of Balloch and Balloch Central Stations

Railway stations in West Dunbartonshire
SPT railway stations
Railway stations served by ScotRail
Railway stations in Great Britain opened in 1988
Railway stations opened by British Rail
Loch Lomond
Vale of Leven